The following is a list of notable deaths in October 1999.

Entries for each day are listed alphabetically by surname. A typical entry lists information in the following sequence:
 Name, age, country of citizenship at birth, subsequent country of citizenship (if applicable), reason for notability, cause of death (if known), and reference.

October 1999

1
Ted Arison, 75, Israeli businessman, heart attack.
Pietro Maria Bardi, 99, Italian writer, curator and collector.
Kuei Chih-hung, 61, Hong Kong filmmaker, liver cancer.
Glen Foster, 69, American sailor and Olympic medalist, esophageal cancer.
Norbert Felix Gaughan, 78, American prelate of the Roman Catholic Church.
Noel Johnson, 82, English actor.
Gunnar Ljungström, 94, Swedish aerodynamics and automobile engineer.
Wim Polak, 75, Dutch politician, mayor of Amsterdam (1977-1983), cancer.
Lena Zavaroni, 35, Scottish singer and a television show host, pneumonia.

2
Muhammad Nasiruddin al-Albani, Albanian Islamic scholar.
Milan Antal, 64, Slovak astronomer.
Kim Hyun-jun, 39, South Korean basketball player, car accident.
Tosio Katō, 82, Japanese mathematician.
Heinz G. Konsalik, 78, German novelist.
R. S. Krishnan, 88, Indian experimental physicist and scientist.
Lee Lozano, 68, American painter and visual artist.
Danny Mayo, 49, American songwriter, heart attack.
Lee Richardson, 73, American actor.
Wayne Sevier, 58, American gridiron football coach, heart attack.
Georg Tintner, 82, Austrian conductor, suicide.

3
Paul Burris, 76, American baseball player.
Alastair Hetherington, 79, British journalist and editor of The Guardian.
N. Mohanan, 66, Indian Malayalam -language short story writer and novelist.
Akio Morita, 78, Japanese businessman and co-founder of Sony, pneumonia.

4
Bernard Buffet, 71, French painter, suicide.
Art Farmer, 71, American jazz trumpeter and flugelhorn player.
De Villiers Graaff, 85, South African politician.
Nikkyō Niwano, 92, Japanese Buddhist leader.
Emil Schumacher, 87, German painter.
Rod Shoate, 46, American gridiron football player.
Leonard Shoen, 83, American entrepreneur, suicide by car crash.
Robert G. L. Waite, 80, Canadian historian, psychohistorian, and academic.

5
Fernand Dubé, 70, Canadian lawyer and politician, heart attack.
Earl Evans, 89, American biochemist.
Alex Lowe, 40, American mountaineer, avalanche.
Frank K. Richardson, 85, American attorney and judge, Parkinson's disease.
Jack Somerville, 89, New Zealand presbyterian leader.

6
Larry Floyd, 91, Australian politician.
Randi Kolstad, 74, Norwegian theater and screen actress.
Gorilla Monsoon, 62, American wrestler and commentator, complications of diabetes.
Patrick Reilly, 90, British diplomat and ambassador.
Amália Rodrigues, 79, Portuguese singer known as the "Queen of Fado", heart attack.
Tatevik Sazandaryan, 83, Soviet and Armenian operatic mezzo-soprano.
Maris Wrixon, 82, American film and television actress, heart failure.

7
Deryck Guyler, 85, English actor.
David A. Huffman, 74, American computer scientist, cancer.
Bruce Ritter, 72, American catholic priest and Franciscan friar, cancer.
Genrikh Sapgir, 70, Russian poet and fiction writer, heart attack.
Lucien Thèze, 86, French basketball player.
Dimitri Tsafendas, 81, Greek-Mozambican political militant, pneumonia.
Helen Vinson, 92, American film actress.
Dave Whitsell, 63, American football player, cancer.

8
Manfredo Fest, 63, Brazilian bossa nova and jazz pianist and keyboardist.
Henri Koch-Kent, 94, Luxembourgian publicist, author, and historian.
Zezé Macedo, 83, Brazilian comedienne and actress.
John McLendon, 84, American basketball coach.
Reinis Zusters, 81, Latvian-Australian artist.

9
Dutch Dotterer, 67, American baseball player.
Milt Jackson, 76, American jazz vibraphonist, liver cancer.
Akhtar Hameed Khan, 85, Pakistani social scientist, heart attack.
James M. Logan, 78, American soldier and recipient of the Medal of Honor.
João Cabral de Melo Neto, 79, Brazilian poet and diplomat.
Rolf Stein, 88, German-French sinologist and tibetologist.
Morris West, 83, Australian novelist and playwright.
Franz Wolf, 92, German nazi SS-Oberscharführer and Holocaust perpetrator during World War II.

10
Patrick Campbell, 22, Northern Irish republican and volunteer, stabbed.
George Forrest, 84, American writer of music and lyrics for musicals.
Alfredo Gil, 84, Mexican singer (Trio Los Panchos).
Gul Hassan Khan, Pakistani Army general.
Hajime Nakamura, 86, Japanese indologist, philosopher and academic.
Ted White, 86, Australian cricketer.

11
Adriano Bassetto, 74, Italian football player.
Fakir Baykurt, 70, Turkish author and trade unionist.
Galina Bystrova, 65, Soviet athlete.
John Foot, Baron Foot, 90, British politician and Life Peer.
Leo Lionni, 89, Italian-American author and illustrator of children's books, Parkinson's disease.
Colette Picard, 85, French archaeologist and historian.
Oscar Valicelli, 84, Argentine film actor.

12
Carlos Barreto, 23, Venezuelan bantamweight boxer and Olympian, brian trauma sustained during match.
Wilt Chamberlain, 63, American basketball player and actor (Conan the Destroyer), congestive heart failure.
Frank Frost, 63, American blues harmonica player, cardiac arrest, heart attack.
Ayako Miura, 77, Japanese novelist, multiple organ dysfunction syndrome.
Clément Perron, 70, Canadian film director and screenwriter.

13
Geoffrey Burke, 86, English Roman Catholic bishop.
Ingrid Englund, 73, Swedish alpine skier and Olympian.
Michael Hartnett, 58, Irish poet, alcoholic liver disease.
James E. Williams, 68, American Cherokee indian and Medal of Honor recipient.
Qasem-Ali Zahirnejad, Iranian Army general, stroke.

14
Franca Dominici, 92, Italian actress and voice actress.
Diethard Hellmann, 70, German Kantor and an academic.
Julius Nyerere, 77, Tanzanian anti-colonial activist and politician, leukemia.
Richard B. Shull, 70, American actor, heart attack.
Jerry Walter McFadden, 51, American serial killer and sex offender, execution by lethal injection.

15
Yosef Burg, 90, German-born Israeli politician.
Durgawati Devi, 92, Indian revolutionary and a freedom fighter.
Terry Gilkyson, 83, American folk singer, composer, and lyricist.
Eddie Jones, 64, British science fiction illustrator.
Torsten Lilliecrona, 78, Swedish actor.
Josef Locke, 82, Irish tenor.
Steve Ramsey, 51, American gridiron football player, traffic accident.

16
Bobbie Beard, 69, American child actor.
Bruce Cameron, 43, American guitarist, suicide.
Bill Dodgin, 90, English football player, manager and coach.
Ella Mae Morse, 75, American popular singer, respiratory failure.
Jean Shepherd, 78, American raconteur, radio and TV personality, writer and actor.

17
Hugh Bolton, 70, Canadian ice hockey player.
William Gould Dow, 104, American scientist, educator and inventor.
Tommy Durden, 79, American guitarist and songwriter.
Richard John Harrison, 79, British academic.
Rick Lapointe, 44, Canadian ice hockey player, heart attack.
Nicholas Metropolis, 84, Greek-American physicist.
Ralph Grey, Baron Grey of Naunton, 89,  New Zealand peer and last Governor of Northern Ireland.
Charles Wanstall, 87, Australian politician.
Franz Peter Wirth, 80, German film director and screenwriter.

18
Dallas Bower, 92, British director and producer.
Mahanambrata Brahmachari, 94, Hindu monk.
John Cannon, 66, sports car racer, aircraft crash.
Tony Crombie, 74, English jazz drummer, pianist, bandleader and composer.
Paddi Edwards, 68, British-American actress, respiratory failure.
Ross Parmenter, 87, Canadian music critic, editor, and author.

19
Auður Auðuns, 88, Icelandic lawyer and politician.
Harry Bannink, 70, Dutch composer, arranger and pianist.
Robert Black, 93, British colonial administrator, Governor of Singapore (1955-1957).
Hayes Gordon, 79, American actor, stage director and acting teacher, heart disease.
Ray Katt, 72, American baseball player and coach, lymphoma.
Zeng Liansong, 81, Chinese economist and designer of the nation's flag.
Penelope Mortimer, 81, English journalist, biographer and novelist, cancer.
James C. Murray, 82, American politician.
Nathalie Sarraute, 99, French writer and lawyer..
E. J. Scovell, 92, English poet and translator.

20
Hans Georg Amsel, 94, German entomologist.
Loukas Barlos, 79, Greek businessman, lung cancer.
Agim Çavdarbasha, 55, Kosovo-Albanian sculptor.
Calvin Griffith, 87, American Major League Baseball team owner.
Mae Street Kidd, 95, American businesswoman, civic leader and politician.
Jack Lynch, 82, Irish Fianna Fáil politician and fourth Taoiseach (1966–1973, 1977–1979), cerebrovascular disease.
Willi Schröder, 70, German football player.
Abdullah Sungkar, 62, Indonesian islamist and founder of terror group Jemaah Islamiyah.

21
Queenie Ashton, 95, Australian actress.
Lars Bo, 75, Danish artist and writer.
John Bromwich, 80, Australian tennis player.
Esther Fernández, 84, Mexican film and television actress, lung infarction.
H. Stuart Hughes, 83, American historian, professor, and activist.
LaMont Johnson, 58, American jazz pianist, heart failure.
Ahmet Taner Kışlalı, 60, Turkish politician, intellectual, lawyer, columnist, and academic.
Horst Krüger, 80, German novelist.
Fran O'Brien, 63, American football player, heart attack.
Heinz Renneberg, 72, West German rower and Olympic champion.
Gennady Vasilyev, 59, Russian film director, cerebral hemorrhage.
Eric Wauters, 48, Belgian equestrian and Olympic medalist.

22
Alphonse Anger, 84, French gymnast.
Martin Donnelly, 82, New Zealand cricketer and England rugby player.
Ed Mikan, 74, American basketball player.
István Nagy, 60, Hungarian football player.
Gordon Smith, 91, American ice hockey player.
Irv Spencer, 61, Canadian ice hockey player.

23
Jean Dauger, 79, French rugby player.
András Hegedüs, 76, Hungarian communist politician.
Neriman Köksal, 71, Turkish actress, breast cancer.
Trudi Meyer, 85, German gymnast.
Eric Reece, 90, Australian politician, Premier of Tasmania (1958-1969).
Luciano Soprani, Italian fashion designer, throat cancer.
Cyril James Stubblefield, 98, British geologist.
Albert Tucker, 84, Australian artist.
Francis Whitaker, 93, American artist and blacksmith.
Bobby Willis, 57, British songwriter, lung and liver cancer.

24
John Chafee, 77, American politician and senator, congestive heart failure.
Lucien De Muynck, 68, Belgian middle-distance runner and Olympian.
Georges Gandil, 73, French sprint canoeist.
Ginette Harrison, 41, British climber, climbing accident.
Berthe Qvistgaard, 89, Danish stage and film actress.
Philip Sansom, 83, British anarchist writer and activist.
Marc Simenon, 60, French director and screenwriter, fall.

25
Leonard Boyle, 75, Irish and Canadian scholar in medieval studies and palaeography.
Vittorio Erspamer, 90, Italian pharmacologist and chemist.
Rosalie Gascoigne, 82, New Zealand-Australian sculptor.
Arturo Herbruger, 87, Guatemalan politician.
Samson Kisekka, 87, Ugandan politician, heart attack.
Johannes Käbin, 94, Soviet  and Estonian politician.
Victor Saúde Maria, 60, Bissau-Guinean politician, homicide.
S. Rajeswara Rao, 77, Indian composer and musician.
Payne Stewart, 42, American golfer, plane crash.
David Spence Thomson, 83, New Zealand politician.

26
Maria Alba, 89, Spanish-American film actress.
Hoyt Axton, 61, American folk music singer-songwriter and actor, heart attack.
Eknath Easwaran, 88, Indian-American spiritual teacher and author.
Rex Gildo, 63, German singer of schlager ballads, suicide.
Christiane Jaccottet, 62, Swiss harpsichordist and musicologist.
Abraham Polonsky, 88, American film director, screenwriter, essayist and novelist.
Albert Whitlock, 84, British motion picture matte artist, Parkinson's disease.

27
Wes Berggren, 28, American musician and guitarist for rock band Tripping Daisy, drug overdose.
Johnny Byrne, 60, English footballer, heart attack.
Lois Collier, 80, American film actress, Alzheimer's disease.
Frank De Vol, 88, American arranger, composer and actor, heart failure.
Xie Fei, 66, Chinese politician, Politburo member, leukemia.
Robert Mills, 72, American physicist.
José Aarón Alvarado Nieves, 33, Mexican professional wrestler, infection.
Éamonn O'Doherty, 60, Northern Irish political activist.
Charlotte Perriand, 96, French architect and designer.
Glen Vernon, 76, American actor.
Austin B. Williams, 80, American carcinologist, cancer.
 Notable victims killed in the Armenian parliament shooting in Yerevan, Armenia:
Vazgen Sargsyan, 40, Prime Minister
Karen Demirchyan, 67, National Assembly Speaker
Yuri Bakhshyan, 52, Deputy National Assembly Speaker
Leonard Petrosyan, 46, Minister of Urgent Affairs

28
Howard Browne, 91, American science fiction editor and mystery writer.
Ralph Crosthwaite, 63, American basketball player.
Antonis Katinaris, 68, Greek musician.
Rafael Alberti Merello, 96, Spanish poet.
Gastone Pescucci, 73, Italian actor and voice actor.

29
Kamal Adham, 71, Saudi businessman, heart attack.
Brita Appelgren, 86, Swedish film actress.
Rosa Furman, 69, Mexican actress, cardiac arrest.
Greg, 68, Belgian cartoonist, aneurysm.
Cavan Kendall, 57, British actor, cancer.
Colin Matthew, 58, British historian and academic, heart attack.
Aolar Mosely, 87, American artist.
Borhan Abu Samah, 34, Singaporean football player, liver cancer.

30
Nise da Silveira, 94, Brazilian psychiatrist and student of Carl Jung, pneumonia.
Grace McDonald, 81, American actress, pneumonia.
Uxío Novoneyra, 69, Spanish poet, journalist and children's writer.
Max Patkin, 79, American baseball player and clown.
Gábor Pogány, 84, Hungarian-born Italian cinematographer.
Savumiamoorthy Thondaman, 86, Sri Lankan politician.
Maigonis Valdmanis, 66, Latvian basketball player.
Paul Wheatley, 78, British-American historical geographer.
Ratko Čolić, 81, Serbian football player.

31
Denise Bellon, 97, French photographer.
August Chełkowski, 72, Polish physicist and politician.
John Wainwright Evans, 90, American astronomer, murder–suicide.
Howard Ferguson, 91, Irish composer and musicologist.
Martin Hellberg, 94, German actor, director and writer.
Immanuel Jakobovits, Baron Jakobovits, 78, British rabbi.
Greg Moore, 24, Canadian racecar driver, racing accident .
Wyatt Ruther, 76, American jazz double-bassist.

References 

1999-10
10